The beetles of the subfamily Pilipalpinae belong to the small family of fire-coloured beetles (Pyrochroidae). They are found only in the Southern Hemisphere, occurring in Australia, Chile, Madagascar and New Zealand. Most of the genera are small or even monotypic, but it is highly likely that a number of undescribed species exist.

Genera
 Binburrum
 Cycloderus
 Exocalopus
 Incollogenius
 Malagaethes
 Morpholycus
 Paromarteon
 Pilipalpus
 Ranomafana
 Techmessa
 Techmessodes
 Temnopalpus

References

Pyrochroidae
Taxa named by Mohammad Abdullah (entomologist)